Camptown is a census-designated place in Isle of Wight County, Virginia, United States, lying just east of Franklin. The population as of the 2010 census was 766. The International Paper mill (formerly Union Camp, now closed) is here along with a black
Community known as Camptown.

Geography
Camptown is bordered to the west by the Blackwater River, which forms the border between Isle of Wight County and the independent city of Franklin. The southeast corner of the CDP borders the city of Suffolk.

U.S. Route 58 Business and U.S. Route 258 Business run through Camptown together as Carrsville Highway. U.S. Route 258 Bypass runs through the eastern side of Camptown as Camp Family Highway.

References

Census-designated places in Isle of Wight County, Virginia
Census-designated places in Virginia